South Korea (IOC designation:Korea) participated in the 1990 Asian Games held in Beijing, the People's Republic of China from September 22, 1990 to October 7, 1990.

Medal summary

Medal table

Medalists

References

Korea, South
1990
Asian Games